Platform  is the second studio album by American electronic producer Holly Herndon, released on May 19, 2015, via 4AD. The album received wide critical acclaim upon its release. It is the first commercially released album to include a track intended to trigger autonomous sensory meridian response (ASMR), "Lonely at the Top".

Critical reception

Winston Cook-Wilson of Pitchfork wrote that "Platform may turn out to be the most thought-provoking experimental electronic music release of the year." Laurie Tuffrey of The Quietus wrote that "in so solidly refuting musical clichés, it can genuinely lay claim to the oft-used description forward-facing." The Guardians Tshepo Mokoena wrote that "[Herndon] turns cold, lifeless synthetic beats into disconcerting, disjointed rhythms that glitch and collapse on each other", describing the album as "gloriously avant garde and fiercely inventive." Drowned in Sound wrote that "at once Herndon’s most accessible and most adventurous record, this is digital age avant-garde sound art put through a pop prism, and it’s all the more exciting as a result." Heather Phares of AllMusic described the album as "nuanced in how it combines political, technological and structural and ideological concepts." In naming Platform among 2015's best experimental albums, PopMatters wrote: "It’s fair to say if you're unfamiliar with [Herndon's] work, you've never heard anything like it: EDM-streaked sound collage, at once robotic and deeply personal."

Accolades

Track listing
All songs written and produced by Holly Herndon; except where noted

Charts

References

2015 albums
Holly Herndon albums
4AD albums
Experimental pop albums
Sound collage albums